Brother Rat is a 1938 American comedy drama film about cadets at Virginia Military Institute in Lexington, Virginia, directed by William Keighley, and starring Ronald Reagan, Priscilla Lane, Eddie Albert (in his film debut), Jane Wyman, and Wayne Morris.

The film is an adaptation of the successful Broadway play of the same name written by two former VMI cadets, John Monks, Jr. and Fred Finklehoffe, which ran for 577 performances between December 1936 and April 1938. Albert and supporting actor William Tracy reprised their roles in the stage productions.	

After the film's production, Reagan married Wyman in 1940. The title refers to the term used for cadets in their first year at the Institute.  Scenes of the film were shot on site in Lexington on the institute's historic parade ground, and the baseball game scene was filmed at Alumni Memorial Field.

Plot
At the Virginia Military Institute, roommates Billy Randolph (Wayne Morris), Dan Crawford (Ronald Reagan) and Bing Edwards (Eddie Albert) are three good-natured troublemakers who are trying to clean up their act in the weeks leading up to graduation. Still, try as they might, they cannot seem to stop breaking the rules, which include sneaking girlfriends on campus, and pawning the college's valuable sword to get money to bet on a baseball game. When the secretly married Edwards learns his wife (Jane Bryan) is pregnant, his preoccupation leads to events that really send everything out of order.

Cast

 Ronald Reagan as Dan Crawford
 Priscilla Lane as Joyce Winfree
 Eddie Albert as Bing Edwards
 Jane Wyman as Claire Adams
 Wayne Morris as Billy Randolph
 Johnnie Davis as A. Furman Towsend, Jr.
 Jane Bryan as Kate Rice
 Henry O'Neill as Colonel Ramm
 Gordon Oliver as Capt. 'Lacedrawers' Rogers
 Larry Williams as Harley Harrington
 William Tracy as Misto Bottome
 Jessie Busley as Mrs. Brooks
 Olin Howland as Slim
 Louise Beavers as Jenny
 Isabel Withers as Nurse
 Sam Komie as Cadet
 Billy Smith as Cadet
 Allan Cavan as Superintendent (uncredited)
 Jerry Cecil as Cadet (uncredited)
 Don DeFore as Baseball Catcher (uncredited)
 Jerry Fletcher as Cadet With a Sweet Briar Girl (uncredited)
 Mildred Gover as Colonel Ramm's Maid (uncredited)
 Fred Hamilton as Newsreel Scott (uncredited)
 Dutch Hendrian as Baseball Coach (uncredited)
 Howard Leeds as Cadet (uncredited)
 Wilfred Lucas as Ballfield Doctor (uncredited)
 Hugh McArthur as Cadet (uncredited)
 George O'Hanlon as Orderly (uncredited)
 William T. Orr as Member of the Guard (uncredited)
 Mark Roberts as Tripod Andrews (uncredited)
 Cliff Saum as Baseball Umpire (uncredited)
 Tom Seidel as Cadet (uncredited)

Reception
Frank S. Nugent of The New York Times called the film "an excellent transcription of the play, loyal to all its screenable material and matching the playwrights' lively humors in the added scenes." "None of the factors that made the play a success has been lost ... Albert gives a splendid performance," reported Variety. Film Daily wrote that Keighley gave the film "warm, sympathetic direction and has injected many human touches," and called Eddie Albert "a definite screen 'find'." Harrison's Reports declared it "A delightful comedy" with "excellent" performances. John Mosher of The New Yorker called it "a serviceable time-filler."

A sequel, Brother Rat and a Baby, with several of the same main actors, was released in 1940.

In 1952, Warner Brothers remade it as a Technicolor musical, About Face, with Gordon MacRae, Eddie Bracken and in his first film, Joel Grey.

See also
 Ronald Reagan films

References

External links

 
 
 
 
 Review of Brother Rat at TVGuide.com
 Brother Rat and a Baby (sequel, 1940) at Internet Movie Database

1938 films
1930s English-language films
Films directed by William Keighley
Films scored by Heinz Roemheld
1938 comedy-drama films
Films set in Virginia
Films shot in Virginia
VMI Keydets
Warner Bros. films
American comedy-drama films
American black-and-white films
1930s American films